Blackberry Hill, also known as Mills House, is a historic plantation house located near Tryon, Polk County, North Carolina.  It was built about 1847, and is a two-story, five bay, Federal style frame dwelling.  It has exterior gable end chimneys and flanking one-story wing additions.  The front facade features a two-tier colonnaded porch.

It was added to the National Register of Historic Places in 1974.

References

Plantation houses in North Carolina
Houses on the National Register of Historic Places in North Carolina
Federal architecture in North Carolina
Houses completed in 1847
Houses in Polk County, North Carolina
National Register of Historic Places in Polk County, North Carolina
1847 establishments in North Carolina